Bangladesh Film Development Corporation or BFDC, is a government owned and operated corporation in Tejgaon, Dhaka, Bangladesh. Nuzhat Yeasmin is the managing director of the corporation.

History
The organization was founded in 1959 as the East Pakistan Film Development Corporation which was changed to Bangladesh Film Development Corporation after Bangladesh achieved independence in 1971. It signed an agreement with National Film Development Corporation of India in 2016 to jointly produce a documentary on Bangladesh Liberation war. It has faced criticism on mismanagement and waste of public funds. On 3 April of evey year the National Film day of Bangladesh is observed, the day is organized and celebrated by the corporation. The day marks the occasion when Sheikh Mujibur Rahman then Minister of Industries and Commerce of East Pakistan introduced the bill to formulate the East Pakistan Film development corporation.

References

1959 establishments in East Pakistan
Government agencies of Bangladesh
Organisations based in Dhaka
Film organisations in Bangladesh
Government-owned companies of Bangladesh
Ministry of Information and Broadcasting (Bangladesh)
Sheikh Mujibur Rahman